Eric Alan Smedley (born July 23, 1973) is a former professional American football safety in the National Football League. He was selected in the 7th round (249th overall) of the 1996 NFL Draft after playing college football for Indiana University. He played four seasons in the NFL, three for the Buffalo Bills and one for the Indianapolis Colts.

1973 births
Living people
Sportspeople from Charleston, West Virginia
Players of American football from West Virginia
American football defensive backs
Indiana Hoosiers football players
Buffalo Bills players
Indianapolis Colts players